Frank Dolphin is an Irish businessman known for his involvement with the Irish Health Service, as a former chairman of Temple Street Children's University Hospital and Governor of the Mater Hospital, as a past President of the Waterford Chamber of Commerce, and for founding RigneyDolphin Ltd.



Education
Dolphin was born in Birr, County Offaly and attended Presentation College in Birr. He subsequently attended University College Dublin, where he obtained a PhD in Psychology. His early research on information models in speech fluency was recognised by the British Psychological Society when he was awarded their Young Psychologist of the year award for his post graduate research.

He lectured at Trinity College Dublin (covering the topics of Psychology and Consumer Behaviour) while working on his PhD at Temple Street. After obtaining his PhD he moved to Waterford and set up the department of Psychology at the Waterford Institute of Technology (then Regional Technical College) and was responsible for introducing counselling and medical services there. He also worked as a consulting psychologist for St Joseph's Industrial School, Clonmel.

Dolphin is currently on the board of Governors of WIT.

RigneyDolphin Ltd.
In 1990, Dolphin left the WIT and founded RigneyDolphin Ltd. He remains chairman of the firm. The firm initially offered a range of recruitment, HR and consultancy services but in recent years have focused on business support services catering to national and international clients.

In 2010 RigneyDolphin employed 1,200 staff at offices in Dublin, Dundalk, Derry and Waterford with an annual turnover of €20.2 million.

Health Service
In 2009 Dolphin was appointed chairman of Temple Street Children's University Hospital.

In July 2010 the Minister for Health and Children Mary Harney announced that Dolphin would assume the role of Chairman of the Health Service Executive with effect from 15 August 2010. Dolphin stepped down from this role in December 2011.

In March 2012 Dolphin was chosen to lead the review group for the construction of a new children's hospital, following the refusal by An Bord Pleanála to give planning permission for the proposed Children's Hospital of Ireland at a site on Eccles Street. Enda Kenny stated that the report this group put forward (the "Dolphin Report") would be the only one used to decide on the location of the proposed hospital. The Dolphin Report did not rank locations, but left the final decision to the cabinet; in the end, St. James's Hospital was chosen as the site for the new children's hospital, with a €500m budget being allocated to the project.

Chamber of Commerce 

Dolphin was President of the Waterford Chamber of Commerce in '05/'06. While President, he presented a paper to the World Chambers Federation's 4th World Chamber Congress in Durban on "Training Solutions", Waterford Chamber's training and development business, in conjunction with Training Solutions founder and Deputy CEO of Waterford Chamber Michael Cox.

References

External links 
 RigneyDolphin Profile

Living people
20th-century Irish people
21st-century Irish people
Irish businesspeople
People from County Offaly
Alumni of University College Dublin
Irish psychologists
Year of birth missing (living people)
People associated with Waterford Institute of Technology